Rossia moelleri is a species of bobtail squid native to the northern Atlantic Ocean and the Arctic Ocean, eastward to the Laptev Sea and westward to Amundsen Bay. It occurs off western and northeastern Greenland, northeastern Canada, Labrador, Spitsbergen, Jan Mayen, and in the Kara Sea. R. moelleri lives at depths from 17 to 250 m.

R. moelleri grows to 50 mm in mantle length.

In Norwegian waters, R. moelleri is preyed upon by haddock (Melanogrammus aeglefinus) and Atlantic cod (Gadus  morhua).

The type specimen was collected off Greenland. It was originally deposited at the Zoologisk Museum of Kobenhavns Universitet in Copenhagen, but is no longer extant.

References

External links

Bobtail squid
Molluscs of the Atlantic Ocean
Molluscs of North America
Molluscs of Canada
Fauna of Greenland
Cephalopods described in 1856